Thinking Ape Blues is a webcomic created by freelance illustrator Mark Poutenis.

The strip stars three "brothers" Abe, Ben and Carl Progress (a simian, a sapien and a robot respectively), and frequently explores themes of conflict between man's primordial and civilized selves while throwing in the occasional pop culture reference.  One might even see the three "brothers" as the id, the ego and the superego(respectively).  

The strip appears in several regional print publications, including the Boston-area Weekly Dig. Material from Thinking Ape Blues was included in Attitude 3: The New Subversive Online Cartoonists.

External links
 Official site (archived)

2003 webcomic debuts
2012 webcomic endings
American webcomics
Political webcomics
Webcomics in print
Unfinished webcomics